is a Japanese triathlete. She won the gold medal in the women's triathlon at the 2018 Asian Games in Jakarta, Indonesia.

She also won the gold medal in the mixed relay event.

In 2021, she competed in the women's event at the 2020 Summer Olympics in Tokyo, Japan. She also competed in the mixed relay event.

References

External links 
 

Living people
1991 births
People from Mitaka, Tokyo
Japanese female triathletes
Asian Games medalists in triathlon
Triathletes at the 2018 Asian Games
Asian Games gold medalists for Japan
Medalists at the 2018 Asian Games
Triathletes at the 2020 Summer Olympics
Olympic triathletes of Japan
20th-century Japanese women
21st-century Japanese women